Raúl Rettig Guissen (16 May 1909, in Temuco – 30 April 2000, in Santiago), was a Chilean politician and lawyer.

A member of the Radical Party, between 1938 and 1940 he served as undersecretary of the interior and, later, at the foreign affairs ministry. He was elected to the Senate in 1949. During the Unidad Popular government of President Salvador Allende, he served as ambassador to Brazil until the coup d'état of 11 September 1973.

During the early days of the government of Patricio Aylwin, he was appointed to chair the National Commission for Truth and Reconciliation, a truth commission set up to examine human rights violations committed under the military dictatorship of Augusto Pinochet. The commission's final report, known as the Rettig Report, was published on 9 February 1991.

Sources
The earliest version of this article was translated, with minor adaptations, from the corresponding article on the Spanish-language Wikipedia.

1909 births
2000 deaths
Members of the Senate of Chile
Chilean diplomats
Ambassadors of Chile to Brazil
People from Temuco
University of Concepción alumni
University of Chile alumni
Chilean people of German descent
Radical Party of Chile politicians
20th-century Chilean lawyers